The Walter Reed Army Medical Center (WRAMC), officially known as Walter Reed General Hospital (WRGH) until 1951, was the U.S. Army's flagship medical center from 1909 to 2011. The center was named after Walter Reed, a U.S. Army physician and sergeant who led the team that confirmed that yellow fever is transmitted by mosquitoes rather than direct physical contact.

WRAMC combined with the National Naval Medical Center at Bethesda, Maryland in 2011 to form the tri-service Walter Reed National Military Medical Center (WRNMMC). The grounds and historic buildings of the old campus are being redeveloped as the Parks at Walter Reed.

History

Origins at Fort McNair
Fort Lesley J. McNair, located in the southwest of the District of Columbia on land set aside by George Washington as a military reservation, is the third oldest U.S. Army installation in continuous use in the United States after West Point and Carlisle Barracks. Its position at the confluence of the Anacostia River and the Potomac River made it an excellent site for the defense of the nation's capital. Dating back to 1791, the post served as an arsenal, played an important role in the nation's defense, and housed the first U.S. Federal Penitentiary from 1839 to 1862.

Today, Fort McNair enjoys a strong tradition as the intellectual headquarters for defense. Furthermore, with unparalleled vistas of the picturesque waterfront and the opposing Virginia shoreline, the historic health clinic at Fort McNair, the precursor of today's Walter Reed Army Medical Center (WRAMC), overlooks the residences of top officials who choose the famed facility for the delivery of their health care needs.

"Walter Reed's Clinic," the location of the present day health clinic at Washington, D.C., occupies what was from 1898 until 1909 the General Hospital at what was then Washington Barracks, long before the post was renamed in honor of Lt. Gen. McNair who was killed in 1944. The hospital served as the forerunner of Walter Reed General Hospital; however, the Victorian era waterfront dispensary remains and is perhaps one of America's most historically significant military medical treatment facilities. It is reported that Walter Reed lived and worked in the facility when he was assigned as Camp Surgeon from 1881 to 1882. After having served on other assignments, he returned as Professor of Medicine and Curator of the Army Medical Museum. Some of his epidemiological work included studies at Washington Barracks, and he is best known for discovering the transmission of yellow fever. In 1902, Major Reed underwent emergency surgery here for appendicitis and died of complications in this U.S. Army Medical Treatment Facility (MTF), within the very walls of what became his final military duty assignment.

Regarding the structure itself, since the 1890s the health clinic was used as an Army General Hospital where physicians, corpsmen and nurses were trained in military health care. In 1899, the morgue was constructed which now houses the Dental Clinic, and in 1901 the hospital became an entirely separate command. This new organizational command relocated eight years later with the aide of horse-drawn wagons and an experimental steam driven ambulance in 1909. Departing from the 50-bed hospital, as documented in The Army Nursing Newsletter, Volume 99, Issue 2, February 2000, they set out due north transporting with them 11 patients initially to the new 65-bed facility in the northern aspect of the capital. Having departed Ft. McNair, the organization has since developed into the Walter Reed Army Medical Center that we know today.

As for the facility they left behind at Fort McNair, it functioned in a smaller role as a post hospital until 1911 when the west wing was converted into a clinic.

Walter Reed General Hospital and WRAMC
Congressional legislation appropriated $192,000 for the construction of Walter Reed General Hospital (WRGH, now known as "Building 1"), and the first ten patients were admitted on May 1, 1909. Lieutenant Colonel William Cline Borden was the initiator, planner and effective mover for the creation, location, and first Congressional support of the Medical Center. Due to his efforts, the facility was nicknamed "Borden's Dream."

In 1923, General John J. Pershing signed the War Department order creating the "Army Medical Center" (AMC) within the same campus as the WRGH. (At this time, the Army Medical School was relocated from 604 Louisiana Avenue and became the "Medical Department Professional Service School" (MDPSS) in the new Building 40.) Pershing lived at Walter Reed from 1944 until his death there July 15, 1948.

In September 1951, "General Order Number 8" combined the WRGH with the AMC, and the entire complex of 100 rose-brick Georgian Revival style buildings was at that time renamed the "Walter Reed Army Medical Center" (WRAMC). In June 1955, the Armed Forces Institute of Pathology (AFIP) occupied the new Building 54 and, in November, what had been MDPSS was renamed the Walter Reed Army Institute of Research (WRAIR). 1964 saw the birth of the Walter Reed Army Institute of Nursing (WRAIN). Former President Dwight D. Eisenhower died at WRAMC on March 28, 1969.

Starting in 1972, a huge new WRAMC building (Building 2) was constructed and made ready for occupation by 1977. WRAIR moved from Building 40 to a large new facility on the WRAMC Forest Glen Annex in Maryland in 1999.  Subsequently, Building 40 was slated for renovation under an enhanced use lease by a private developer.

In 2007, the University of Pennsylvania and WRAMC established a partnership whereby proton therapy technology would be available to treat United States military personnel and veterans in the Perelman Center for Advanced Medicine's new Roberts Proton Therapy Center.

2007 neglect scandal

In February 2007, The Washington Post published a series of investigative articles outlining cases of alleged neglect (physical deterioration of housing quarters outside hospital grounds, bureaucratic nightmares, etc.) at WRAMC as reported by outpatient soldiers and their families. A scandal and media furor quickly developed resulting in the firing of the WRAMC commanding general Maj. Gen. George W. Weightman, the resignation of Secretary of the Army Francis J. Harvey (reportedly at the request of Secretary of Defense Robert Gates), the forced resignation of Lt. Gen. Kevin C. Kiley, hospital commander from 2002 to 2004. Congressional committee hearings were called and numerous politicians weighed in on the matter including President George W. Bush, who had appointed Harvey, and Vice-President Dick Cheney. Several independent governmental investigations are ongoing and the controversy has spread to other military health facilities and the Department of Veterans Affairs health care system.

2005 BRAC recommendation and 2011 closure

As part of a Base Realignment and Closure announcement on May 13, 2005, the Department of Defense proposed replacing Walter Reed Army Medical Center with a new Walter Reed National Military Medical Center (WRNMMC); the new center would be on the grounds of the National Naval Medical Center in Bethesda, Maryland, seven miles (11 km) from WRAMC's location in Washington, D.C.  The proposal was part of a program to transform medical facilities into joint facilities, with staff including Army, Navy, and Air Force medical personnel.

On August 25, 2005, the BRAC Committee recommended passage of the plans for the WRNMMC.  The transfer of services from the existing to the new facilities was gradual to allow for continuity of care for the thousands of service members, retirees and family members that depended upon WRAMC.  The end of operations at the WRAMC facility occurred on August 27, 2011. The Army says the cost of closing that hospital and consolidating it with Bethesda Naval Medical Center in suburban Maryland more than doubled to $2.6 billion since the plan was announced in 2005 by the Base Realignment and Closing Commission.

Gallery

Notable people who died at WRGH or WRAMC

 Creighton W. Abrams (1914–1974) US Army Chief of Staff; Deputy Commander and commander, Military Assistance Command, Vietnam.
 Joseph Beacham (1874–1958) US Army Brigadier General, head football coach at Cornell and the United States Military Academy.
 Charles Billingslea (1914–1989) US Army Major General, recipient of two Distinguished Service Crosses.
 Aaron Bradshaw Jr. (1894–1976) US Army Major General, Commanding General, Anti-Aircraft Artillery, U.S. Fifth Army during World War II.
 Roger Brooke (1878–1940) US Army Brigadier General and physician, Namesake of Brooke Army Medical Center, Fort Sam Houston, Texas.
 Fox Conner (1874–1951) US Army major general, Deputy US Army Chief of Staff, "The man who made Eisenhower."
 Carl Rogers Darnall (1867–1941) US Army Brigadier General and physician. Credited with developing the technique of liquid chlorination of drinking water. Commander of the Army Medical Center 1929–31. Namesake of  Carl R. Darnall Army Medical Center, Ft Hood, TX.
 Everett M. Dirksen (1896–1969) US Senator from Illinois.
 William J. Donovan (1883–1959) US Army Major General, Medal of Honor recipient and Office of Strategic Services founder.
 John Foster Dulles (1888–1959) US Secretary of State; US Senator from New York
 Dwight D. Eisenhower (1890–1969) General of the Army during World War II; Supreme Allied Commander, Europe; 34th President of the United States.
 Mamie Eisenhower (1896–1979) First Lady of the United States and wife of Dwight D. Eisenhower.
 Francis Henry French (1857–1921) US Army Major General.
 Leslie R. Groves (1896–1970) US Army Lieutenant General, Builder of the Pentagon (United States) and Leader of the Manhattan Project
 Paul Ramsey Hawley (1891–1965) US Army Major General; Chief Surgeon, European Theater of Operations 1943–45; Chief Medical officer, Veterans' Administration 1946–47.
 Leonard D. Heaton (1902–1983) US Army Lieutenant General. Surgeon General of the United States Army 1959–69. Commander of Walter Reed 1953–59.
 Leland Stanford Hobbs (1892–1966). US Army Major General; Commander of IX Corps and 30th Infantry Division in World War II.
 Edgar Erskine Hume (1889–1952) US Army Major General; Command Surgeon, US Far Eastern Command; Command Surgeon, UN Forces in Korea; Chief Surgeon, US Occupying Force in Austria.
 Merritte W. Ireland (1867–1952) US Army Major General; Surgeon General of the United States Army 1918–31. Namesake of Ireland Army Community Hospital, Fort Knox
 Cheddi Jagan (1918–1997) 4th President of Guyana, 1st Premier of British Guiana, and 1st Chief Minister of British Guiana
 Norman T. Kirk (1888–1960) US Army Major General; Surgeon General of the United States Army 1943–47.
 Julian Robert Lindsey (1871−1948), U.S. Brigadier General, Commander, 164th Infantry Brigade, 82nd Division, American Expeditionary Forces
 Douglas MacArthur (1880–1964) US General of the Army, Supreme Commander for the Allied Powers Southwest Pacific Area, US Army Chief of Staff, and U.S. Military Academy Superintendent.
 James C. Magee (1883–1975) US Army Major General; Surgeon General of the United States Army 1939–43.
 Mike Mansfield  (1903–2001)  US Senator from Montana. US Navy Seamen, US Army Private, and US Marine Corps Private First Class
 Peyton C. March (1864–1955) US Army Chief of Staff. US Army General 
 George Catlett Marshall Jr. (1880–1959) US General of the Army, US Army Chief of Staff, Secretary of State, Secretary of Defense, Nobel Peace Laureate.
 John von Neumann (1903–1957), mathematician. Credited with developing the concept of mutual assured destruction.
 William Charles Ocker (1880–1942) American aviation pioneer, "Father of instrument flying."
 Mason Patrick (1863–1942) US Army Major General; Chief of United States Air Service; Chief of United States Air Corps
 Robert U. Patterson (1877–1950) US Army Major General; Surgeon General of the United States Army 1931–35
 John J. Pershing (1860–1948), U.S. General of the Armies, Commander, American Expeditionary Forces during World War I, US Army Chief of Staff.
 Chough Pyung-ok (1894–1960) South Korean politician.
 Walter L. Reed (1877–1956) US Army Major General; Inspector General of the U.S. Army; son of Major Walter Reed, namesake of the hospital
Daniel Isom Sultan (1885-1947),U.S. Lieutenant General, CG 38th Infantry Division, CG VIII Corps, Deputy Commander Burma-India Theater, Inspector General of the U.S. Army
 William M. Wright (1863−1943), U.S. Lieutenant General, CG 89th Division, World War I

Tenants
In addition to the WRAMC hospital complex, the WRAMC installation hosted a number of other related activities and organizations.
 The North Atlantic Regional Medical Command
 The North Atlantic Regional Dental Command
 The Armed Forces Institute of Pathology (AFIP)
 The Uniformed Services University of the Health Sciences (USUHS)
 United States Army Institute of Dental Research (USAIDR)
 The DOD Deployment Health Clinical Center
 The National Museum of Health and Medicine (NMHM) was co-located in the same building with the AFIP. The NMHM reopened 15 September 2011 on Fort Detrick Forest Glen Annex in Silver Spring, Maryland.
 The Borden Institute, a "Center of Excellence in Military Medical Research and Education".
 The Walter Reed Army Institute of Research (WRAIR), formerly in Building 40 on the Georgia Avenue campus. This medical research institute moved to WRAMC's Forest Glen Annex in 1999. In 2008, authority over the Annex was transferred to Fort Detrick in preparation for WRAMC's 2011 move/closure.

Commanding officers
Although after 1992 officers of any branch of the Army Medical Department could command medical treatment facilities, every commander of the Walter Reed Army Medical Center was a member of the Army Medical Corps.

Walter Reed Army Medical Center

The Army Medical Center

Walter Reed General Hospital

See also
 List of former United States Army medical units
 National Register of Historic Places listings in the upper NW Quadrant of Washington, D.C.

References

Further reading
 Adler, Jessica L. "The Founding of Walter Reed General Hospital and the Beginning of Modern Institutional Army Medical Care in the United States." Journal of the history of medicine and allied sciences (2014) 69#4 pp. 521–53.

External links

 Walter Reed and Beyond – A Washington Post Investigation
 Wounded Soldiers Hotline
 Soldiers face neglect, frustration at army's top medical facility
 Award winning student film on the controversy at Walter Reed
 
 Walter Reed Army Medical Center  Documentary produced by WETA-TV

 
Hospitals in Washington, D.C.
Military hospitals in the United States
Military facilities in Washington, D.C.
United States Army medical installations
United States Army posts
Hospital buildings completed in 1909
Historic districts in Washington, D.C.
Government buildings on the National Register of Historic Places in Washington, D.C.
Historic districts on the National Register of Historic Places in Washington, D.C.
Hospital buildings on the National Register of Historic Places in Washington, D.C.
Hospitals established in 1909
1909 establishments in Washington, D.C.
Georgian Revival architecture in Washington, D.C.